The Alaska moose (Alces alces gigas), or Alaskan moose in Alaska, or giant moose and Yukon moose in Canada, is a subspecies of moose that ranges from Alaska to western Yukon. The Alaska moose is the largest subspecies of moose. Alaska moose inhabit boreal forests and mixed deciduous forests throughout most of Alaska and most of Western Yukon. Like all moose subspecies, the Alaska moose is usually solitary but sometimes will form small herds. Typically, they only come into contact with other moose for mating or competition for mates. The males and females select different foraging habitats leading to spatial segregation throughout much of the year. During mating season, in autumn and winter, male Alaska moose become very aggressive and prone to attacking when startled.

Diet

Alaska moose have a similar diet to other moose subspecies, consisting of terrestrial vegetation forbs and shoots from trees such as willow and birch. Alaska moose require a daily intake of 9770 kilocalories (32 kg). Alaska moose lack upper front teeth but have eight sharp incisors on their lower jaw. They also have a tough tongue, gums and lips to help chew woody vegetation.

Size and weight
Alaska moose are sexually dimorphic with males being 40% heavier than females. When Alaska moose are born, they weigh on average about 28 pounds, but by five months old they can weigh up to 280 pounds. Antler size and conformation are influenced by genetics, nutrition, and age. The antlers establish social rank and affect mating success. While Alaska moose with the Chukotka moose, matches the extinct Irish elk, they are smaller than Cervalces latifrons, the largest deer of all time.

Habitat 
Alaska moose are almost omnipresent in Alaska. They range from Southeast Alaska to the Arctic slope in Northern Alaska, and are most likely to be found in the Northern forests. They are more densely concentrated along the major rivers in Alaska, such as the Stikine or Yukon river. They can also be found near areas that have recently experienced wildfires, since that land generates dense willow, birch, and aspen shrubs. Many moose move during mating and calving seasons, and for winter. This can take them up to 60 miles away from their normal habitats.

Social structure and reproduction

Alaska moose have no social bonds with each other and only come into contact with each other to mate, or for two bull moose to fight over mating rights. Although a bull moose is not usually aggressive towards humans, during mating season it may attack any creature it comes into contact with, including humans, wolves, other deer or even bears. Bull moose can get their antlers locked during a fight, and if so both moose can die from severe injuries or starvation. 
However, unlike deer, "fighting bull moose rarely lock horns as their antlers are palmated." Bull moose call out a subtle mating call to attract female moose and to warn other males. If a male moose loses to another male, he has to wait another year to mate. Alaska moose mate every year during autumn and winter, and usually produce one or two offspring at a time. At around 10–11 months, yearling Alaska moose leave their mothers and fend for themselves.

Hunting
Alaska moose are hunted for food and sport every year during fall and winter. People use both firearms and bows to hunt moose. It is estimated that at least 7,000 moose are harvested annually, mostly by residents who eat the moose meat. They are also hunted by animal predators: wolves, black bears, and brown bears all hunt moose.

References

Further reading

Moose
Mammals of the United States
Mammals of Canada
Mammals of the Arctic
Arctic land animals